Southern Lord is an American heavy metal record label that was founded in 1998 by Greg Anderson. It specialized in experimental metal: particularly doom metal, stoner rock, and drone metal.  The label later expanded its line-up to include artists from black metal, hardcore punk and crust punk bands.

History
Before co-founding their own record label Greg Anderson and Stephen O'Malley were friends and bandmates in Thorr's Hammer and Burning Witch. The pair formed a new band named Sunn O))) in 1998 and moved to Los Angeles. They started Southern Lord as a way to have control over the releases of their own recordings.

Southern Lord's first release was the CD version (previously released as a cassette) of Thorr’s Hammer‘s Dommedagsnatt-- a doom/death metal album with Norwegian lyrics. The second release was: Burning Witch‘s Crippled Lucifer-- a compilation CD of the band's first two EPs.

Southern Lord released material by Anderson and O'Malley's latest band, Sunn O))) in 2002. Sunn O))) was later reviewed several times by Ben Ratliff of The New York Times.

The label's roster continued to grow with notable doom releases such as Warhorse's As Heaven Turns to Ash, Place of Skulls Nailed and With Vision, as well as albums from Anderson's band Goatsnake. It also expanded its musical pallet releasing music by: Darkest Hour, Orcustus, and Dave Grohl‘s side project Probot.

The band Earth joined the Southern Lord family in 2005—continuing Southern Lord's involvement in drone and doom music.

Releases from Earth, Sunn O))) (including the heavily lauded Monoliths & Dimensions), and a series of Boris 7″s to go along with the album Smile took place at the end of the decade.

Notable artists

Current

Former

See also 
 Southern Lord Records discography

References

External links
 Official site
 Interview with Greg Anderson about the label

American record labels
Record labels established in 1998
Doom metal record labels
Heavy metal record labels